Banksia glaucifolia is a species of shrub that is endemic to Western Australia. It has deeply serrated, wedge-shaped leaves with sharply pointed lobes, pale yellow flowers and follicles with hairy edges.

Description
The leaves are more or less glaucous and have between six and thirteen narrow triangular, sharply pointed lobes on each side. The flowers are borne on a head containing between 80 and 110 flowers in each head.

Taxonomy and naming
This banksia was first formally described in 1996 by Alex George who gave it the name Dryandra glauca and published the description in the journal Nuytsia from specimens collected in Watheroo National Park in 1986. In 2007, Austin Mast and Kevin Thiele transferred all the Dryandra species to Banksia but as the name Banksia glauca had already been used for a synonym of Banksia integrifolia subsp. integrifolia, Mast and Thiele changed the epithet to glaucifolia. The epithet retains the original use of "glauca", from the Latin glaucus meaning "blue-grey", with the Latin folium for "leaf", referring to the blue-grey leaves of the species.

Distribution and habitat
Banksia glaucifolia grows in kwongan on rises from near Eneabba and Tathra National Park to Badgingarra in the Geraldton Sandplains and Swan Coastal Plain biogeographic regions.

Conservation status
This banksia is classified as "not threatened" by the Western Australian Government Department of Parks and Wildlife.

References

glaucifolia
Endemic flora of Western Australia
Plants described in 1996
Taxa named by Alex George